The 2014–15 Luxembourg Cup was the 90th season of Luxembourg's annual football cup competition. It began on 30 August 2013 with Round 1 and the final was played 31 May 2015. Differdange 03 were the defending champions and successfully defended their title. This made Differdange 03 qualify for the first qualifying round of the 2015–16 UEFA Europa League.

Round 1
The games were played on 30 & 31 August 2014.

Round 2
The games were played on 14 September 2014.

Round 3
The games were played on 5 October 2014.

Round 4
The games were played on 31 October, 1 and 2 November 2014.

Round 5
The games were played on 28, 29, 30 November and 3 December 2014.

Round 6
The sixteen winners of Round 5 competed in this round. The games were played on 7 December 2014.

Quarter-finals
All matches were played 4 April 2015.

Semi-finals

All matches were played 14 May 2015.

Final
The match was played on 31 May 2015.

References

External links
 Official page 
 Private homepage about everything regarding Luxembourg soccer 
 soccerway.com

Luxembourg Cup seasons
Luxembourg Cup
Cup